Augustin Chaho in French or Agosti Xaho in Basque was an important Romantic Basque writer. He was born in Tardets (Atharratze in basque), Soule, French Basqueland on 10 October 1811 and died in Bayonne (Baiona in Basque), Labourd 23 October 1858. He is considered a precursor of left-wing Basque patriotism.

It is usually said that he studied in Paris with Charles Nodier. In Paris he developed his esoteric thought.

He wrote Travel to Navarre during the insurrection of the Basques (1830-1835) (1836, in French, on his experiences in the First Carlist War, which he interprets as an ethnic war of Basques against Spain that would bring about a basque republic.), The Legend of Aitor (in which he invented a national creation myth, that had great acceptance for some time) and Azti-Begia (The Soothsayer's Eye in Souletin Basque).

He was a republican supporter, and became councillor in Bayonne and the Basses-Pyrénées department. He headed the revolution of 1848 in Bayonne. After the Bonapartist coup of 1851, he escaped to Vitoria (Gasteiz in Basque), in Alava, Spanish Basqueland.

References

 Azurmendi, J. 2020: Pentsamenduaren historia Euskal Herrian, Andoain, Jakin. .
 Coyos Etxebarne, B. 2013: Agosti Xahori omenaldia: bere sortzearen bigarren mendeurrena, Donostia, Eusko Ikaskuntza. .
 Urkizu, P. 1992: Agosti Chahoren bizitza eta idazlanak: (1811-1858), Bilbo, Euskaltzaindia. ISBN
 Zabalo, J. 2004: Xaho. El genio de Zuberoa, Tafalla, Txalaparta. .
 Zabaltza, X. 2011: Agosti Xaho. Aitzindari bakartia (1811-1858), Gasteiz, Eusko Jaurlaritzaren Argitalpen Zerbitzu Nagusia.

External links
CHAHO, Joseph Augustin in the Spanish-language Bernardo Estornés Lasa - Auñamendi Encyclopedia
Online edition of 'Azti-Begia'
 Augustin Chaho. Precursor incomprendido. Un précurseur incompris (1811-1858), in Spanish and French, by Xabier Zabaltza
 Aïtor. Légende cantabre / Aitor. - Leyenda cántabra / Aitor. - Kantabriar kondaira

Basque writers
French Basque politicians
People of the First Carlist War
French people of the Revolutions of 1848
Basque-language writers
1811 births
1858 deaths
French male writers